Voodoo is a highly modified North American P-51 Mustang that was the 2013, 2014 and 2016 Unlimited-class champion of the Reno Air Races. The pilot for these wins was Steven Hinton, Jr of Chino, California.

History
The P-51D-25-NA (original s/n 44-73415) was built in 1944 by North American Aviation at Inglewood, California, for the United States Army. The aircraft was then transferred to the Royal Canadian Air Force as a Mustang IV with serial number 9289 in February 1951.

In February 1951, it went down at Richmond, Virginia, and was badly damaged. Again, in February 1962, the aircraft crashed. In March 1977, the aircraft suffered yet another crash. According to the summarized National Transportation Safety Board narrative from report number SEA77FYE12:
There were 2 fatalities. Incident occurred at 13:46 hours. The airframe was destroyed. Incident occurred at Olympia Municipal Airport, Olympia, Washington. The aircraft Ground looped or water swerved during the takeoff run. Stalled or mushed during the initial climb. The factors included; unapproved modification. FAA examiner remarks include: Partially completed dual control modification.

In 1980, the aircraft was sold to William A. Speer, of La Mesa, California, who restored it. In 1988, it made its first restored flight. It first raced as #45, then as #55 using the name Pegasus. The plane was sold at auction in December 1994.

Bob Button of Button Transportation Inc., Wellington, Nevada, owned the plane from 1995 to 1998. He renamed it Voodoo Chile, and raced it as #55. In 1998, the highly modified P-51 raced at the National Championship Air Races in Reno. In 2007, Bob Button retired from air racing after a malfunction. In the 2011 Reno air races, Voodoo and The Galloping Ghost were running in second and third place, respectively, when the latter crashed. Hinton won again in 2014 and 2016.

After Voodoo underwent further modifications including removal of the aircraft's racer paint scheme, and sponsored by Aviation Partners, Hinton made an attempt to break the 3 km World Speed Record of  set by Rare Bear on August 21, 1989. The record attempt was set to occur on August 27, 2017 at an undisclosed location in Idaho but was delayed until the next day due to weather conditions. While this broke the C-1e record set by Will Whiteside in the Yak-3U Steadfast in 2012, due to changes in record measurement standards the Rare Bear record was not bettered as it had to be beaten by at least 1% (533.6 mph).

Timeline

 February 8, 1951: BOC, RCAF 9289
 August 14, 1959: SOC, RCAF 9289
 1958: N6526D, import, James Defuria / Intercontinental Airways, Canastota, New York
 1960: N6526D, sold to R. Ferrer, Patchoque, New York
 1962: N6526D, crashed, Virginia
 1966: N6526D, sold to Frank Guzman, Massapequa, Pennsylvania
 1968: N6526D, sold to Don Bateman, Las Vegas, Nevada
 1969: N6526D, sold to Mike Coutches, Hayward, California; black w/ gold stripe
 1974: N6526D, sold to H. Matteri, State Line, Nevada
 1975: N6526D, sold to William Veatch, Olympia, Washington
 1977: N6526D, March 19, crashed, Olympia, Washington; major damage
 1980: N6526D, sold to Bill Speer, La Mesa, California; restored as Pegasus; modified for racing
 1996: N6526D, sold to Delbert Williams, Voodoo Chile
 1997: N551VC, sold to Bob Button, Dixon, California
 1997: Raced by Tiger Destefani; bare metal, #55 raced as Voodoo Chile
 2006: Raced each year at Reno; Bob Button assumes piloting in 2005
 2008: Will Whiteside became the race pilot for Team Voodoo
 2009: Turtle deck and race canopy reinstalled
 2010: Team Voodoo performed well, but the final race was cancelled due to high winds
 2011: The final was again cancelled
 2011: Offered for sale in November; not sold
 2013: Steven Hinton, Jr. and Voodoo Unlimited Gold Champion at Reno, Nevada
 2014: Steven Hinton, Jr. and Voodoo Unlimited Gold Champion at Reno, Nevada.
 2015: Steven Hinton, Jr. and Voodoo did not finish the Unlimited Gold final due to engine issues
 2016: Steven Hinton, Jr. and Voodoo Unlimited Gold Champion at Reno, Nevada with race average speed of 460.306 mph and winning time of 08:21.980
 2 September 2017: Steven Hinton, Jr. and Voodoo break C-1e speed record at Challis, Idaho
 17 September 2017: Voodoo came in second to Strega flown by James Consalvi in the Unlimited Gold race at the Reno National Championship Air Races.
 28 December 2017 Voodoo donated to Planes of Fame Air Museum in Chino, California. Registration transfer change completed on 5 April, 2018.

See also
Dago Red
Miss Ashley II
Precious Metal
Rare Bear
Red Baron
September Fury
The Galloping Ghost
Tsunami

References

Racing aircraft
Individual aircraft
North American P-51 Mustang